This article presents a list of the historical events and publications of Australian literature during 1886.

Books 

 Mary Fortune — Dora Carleton : A Tale of Australia
 Fergus Hume — The Mystery of the Hansom Cab
 Rosa Praed
 The Brother of the Shadow : A Mystery of To-Day
 Miss Jacobsen's Chance : A Story of Australian Life
  'The Right Honourable' : A Romance of Society and Politics with Justin McCarthy

Poetry 

 Victor Daley
 "Brunette"
 "Poppies"
 John Farrell — "The Last Bullet"
 Henry Kendall — Poems of Henry Kendall
 Henry Parkes — "The Buried Chief"
 A. B. Paterson
 "A Dream of the Melbourne Cup : A Long Way after Gordon"
 "The Mylora Elopement"

Short stories 

 Marcus Clarke — "The Mind-Reader's Curse"
 Mary Fortune — "Bridget's Locket"

Births 

A list, ordered by date of birth (and, if the date is either unspecified or repeated, ordered alphabetically by surname) of births in 1886 of Australian literary figures, authors of written works or literature-related individuals follows, including year of death.

 3 January — Arthur Mailey, cricketer and journalist (died 1967)

Deaths 

A list, ordered by date of death (and, if the date is either unspecified or repeated, ordered alphabetically by surname) of deaths in 1886 of Australian literary figures, authors of written works or literature-related individuals follows, including year of birth.

See also 
 1886 in poetry
 List of years in literature
 List of years in Australian literature
1886 in literature
1885 in Australian literature
1886 in Australia
1887 in Australian literature

References

Literature
Australian literature by year
19th-century Australian literature
1886 in literature